Gold Hill Township may refer to one of the following places in the United States:
Gold Hill Township, Gallatin County, Illinois
Gold Hill Township, Rowan County, North Carolina

Township name disambiguation pages